William Harry Spilman (born July 18, 1954) is a retired Major League Baseball first baseman for the Cincinnati Reds (1978–81), Houston Astros (1981–85, 1988–89), Detroit Tigers (1986), and San Francisco Giants (1986–88). He was also known for his skill as a pinch hitter. He currently coaches in the Kansas City Royals feeder system, as a scout. He previously worked for the Texas Rangers and the Houston Astros.

Playing career
No one drafted Spilman in the 1974 Major League Baseball Draft, and he attended several tryouts with teams before Bill Jameson signed him to a contract with the Cincinnati Reds. In 1977 with the Trois-Rivières Aigles, he won the Eastern League batting title with a .373 average, accruing 184 hits in only 133 games. His average hovered over .400 most of the season and was the highest for a Class AA team in 15 years. By 1978, he was considered one of the Reds' top-hitting prospects.  With Dan Driessen playing first base for the Reds, the team moved Spilman to third in spring training to compete for a backup infielder spot on the roster. Spilman ultimately didn't make the team and spent most of 1978 playing for the Class AAA Indianapolis Indians of the American Association, where he batted .295 with 144 hits, 13 home runs, and seven RBI. The Reds called him up in September, and he made his major league debut September 11, pinch-hitting in a 9-8 victory over the Houston Astros. Ultimately, Spilman appeared in four games in his first major league season.

He helped the Reds win the NL Western Division in 1979 and 1981 and the Giants win the NL Western Division in 1987.

Career Statistics

In 12 seasons he played in 563 Games and had 810 At Bats, 96 Runs, 192 Hits, 34 Doubles, 1 Triple, 18 Home Runs, 117 RBI, 1 Stolen Base, 81 Walks, .237 Batting Average, .306 On-base percentage, .348 Slugging Percentage, 282 Total Bases, 3 Sacrifice Hits, 9 Sacrifice Flies and 8 Intentional Walks.

Coaching career

From 2007 to 2008, he served as hitting coach for the Triple-A Nashville Sounds.

Personal life
His cousin is former White Sox first baseman, Greg Walker. Spilman is best friends with Ray Knight, former teammate on the Reds. The two grew up 20 miles from each other and spent $700 on a pitching machine to work on their hitting while in the Reds' system.

References

External links
, or Retrosheet, or Pura Pelota

1954 births
Living people
Baseball players from Georgia (U.S. state)
Billings Mustangs players
Cincinnati Reds players
Detroit Tigers players
Houston Astros coaches
Houston Astros players
Indianapolis Indians players
Major League Baseball first basemen
Major League Baseball hitting coaches
Minor league baseball managers
Phoenix Firebirds players
San Francisco Giants players
Sportspeople from Albany, Georgia
Tampa Tarpons (1957–1987) players
Tigres de Aragua players
American expatriate baseball players in Venezuela
Trois-Rivières Aigles players
Tucson Toros players